XEERG-AM/XHERG-FM is a radio station serving Guadalupe and Montemorelos, Nuevo León, Mexico.

History

XEDD-AM was founded in Montemorelos, Nuevo León by Adalberto Javier Pezino González on September 12, 1969, on 1560 kHz. In 2000, the station moved to 800 and gained its FM counterpart, XHDD-FM, in 2010 (though it had to remain on AM).

In 2017, now under Multimedios control, XHDD-FM was approved for a major technical increase. The existing Montemorelos facility was repurposed as a booster at 250 watts, while a new, 100,000-watt transmission facility was constructed at La Peña in Guadalupe, Nuevo León, which will provide service in the Monterrey area and make up for coverage lost during the AM-FM migration; the station is also continuity-obligated to serve 388 people in four localities that have no other broadcasting service.

On April 4, 2018, the new facilities were officially turned on, and XHDD became a Monterrey station with a full simulcast of Multimedios's sports talk XERG-AM 690 "RG La Deportiva". The callsign of the stations was also changed from XEDD-AM and XHDD-FM to XEERG-AM and XHERG-FM, effective April 18, 2018. In September 2018, Multimedios was approved to begin HD Radio broadcasts on XHERG-FM.

References

External links

Multimedios Radio
Radio stations in Nuevo León
1969 establishments in Mexico
Radio stations established in 1969
Radio stations in Mexico with continuity obligations